Grange Park railway station is situated just off The Grangeway, Grange Park in the London Borough of Enfield, north London, in Travelcard Zone 5. The station and all trains serving it are operated by Great Northern. Although located on the original 1871 route between Wood Green (now known as Alexandra Palace) and Enfield, this station opened in 1910 at the same time as the line was extended northwards from Enfield to Cuffley.

Services
All services at Grange Park are operated by Great Northern using  EMUs.

The typical off-peak service in trains per hour is:
 2 tph to 
 2 tph to  via 

Oyster pay as you go was introduced at this station on 2 January 2010.

Connections
London Buses route W9 serves the station.

References

External links

Railway stations in the London Borough of Enfield
Former Great Northern Railway stations
Railway stations in Great Britain opened in 1910
Railway stations served by Govia Thameslink Railway
1910 establishments in England